Vibrio cyclitrophicus (previously known as Vibrio cyclotrophicus )  is a polycyclic aromatic hydrocarbon (PAH)-degrading marine bacterium. The type strain is P-2P44T (=ATCC 700982T=PICC 106644T).

Description
Its cells are rod-shaped, some cells being curved. A high percentage of cells are motile during exponential growth, and a few cells are motile during stationary phase. Cells possess either one or two polar or subpolar flagella. Exponential-phase cells measured 0.6-5.0 μm. Some cells form involution bodies during the stationary phase.

References

External links

LPSN
 WORMS entry
Type strain of Vibrio cyclitrophicus at BacDive -  the Bacterial Diversity Metadatabase

Vibrionales
Bacteria described in 2001